East Worlington is a civil parish and hamlet in the North Devon administrative area, in the English county of Devon, England.

In 2001, the village had 241 inhabitants, 173 in 1901 and 194 in 1801. The civil parish also includes the smaller West Worlington. Both settlements have a "St.Mary's Church".

The Domesday Book of 1086 states that East and West Worlington together had 26 households.

References

Hamlets in Devon
North Devon